Dara Resnik (born September 29, 1978) is an American screenwriter, producer, and award-winning director involved in the writing and producing of television series I Love Dick, Marvel's Daredevil, and Shooter. She is the co-creator and showrunner of Apple TV+’s Home Before Dark.

Early life
Resnik was born and raised in New York, New York. She is the daughter of Richard and Elise Resnik. Her father is a corporate and real estate attorney and her paternal grandfather was a Jewish immigrant from Russia who sold pianos including the prop pianos featured in the 1967 film The Producers.

Resnik attended The Dalton School and later earned a Bachelor of Arts in Economics and Communications from Tufts University and a Master of Fine Arts in Motion Picture Producing from the University of Southern California’s School of Cinematic Arts’ Peter Stark Producing Program
.

Career
Following a feature career as a writer for Legally Blondes and a co-producer on Sydney White, Resnik was a writer for Aaron Sorkin’s Studio 60 on the Sunset Strip in 2007 and the comedy series Pushing Daisies, which was nominated in 2008 for a Writers Guild of America Award for Best New Series.

Resnik later wrote and produced Mistresses and Castle for ABC Studios, Jane the Virgin for The CW, and USA Network’s Shooter. She was a co-executive producer for Marvel’s Daredevil series, which was released on Netflix in 2015, and Amazon’s series I Love Dick.

Resnik was the creator, showrunner, and executive producer, along with writer and producer Dana Fox, of Home Before Dark, a Paramount series for Apple TV+ inspired by real-life 12-year-old crime reporter Hilde Lysiak. The mystery drama series focuses on the experiences of a young woman returning to "the small lakeside town her father left behind."

Resnik is currently showrunning The Horror of Dolores Roach for Amazon.

Resnik is a faculty member of the Peter Stark Producing Program and the John Wells Division of Writing for Screen & Television at the University of Southern California and also teaches at the Sundance Institute Labs program.

Awards
In 2004, Resnik's short film Great Lengths won two Gold awards at the WorldFest-Houston International Film Festival in the short film and short film director categories. Resnik was a writer for the comedy series Pushing Daisies, which was nominated in 2008 for a Writers Guild of America Award for Best New Series.

Personal life
Resnik is a single mom. She lives in Los Angeles with her daughter. Resnik participated in the LA Marathon and is involved at IKAR, a Los Angeles-based progressive Jewish congregation.

Filmography

Television

Films

Short films

References

External links

1978 births
Living people
21st-century American women writers
American film producers
American television writers
American women film producers
American women screenwriters
Dalton School alumni
Showrunners
Television producers from New York City
Tufts University School of Arts and Sciences alumni
University of Southern California alumni
American women television producers
American women television writers
21st-century American screenwriters